Guichenotia ledifolia is a species of flowering plant in the family Malvaceae and is endemic to the southwest of Western Australia.

The species was formally described in 1821 by Swiss-French botanist Jaques Étienne Gay in the journal Mémoires du Muséum d'Histoire Naturelle. The specific epithet (ledifolia) means Ledum-leaved" or "broomlike".

Guichenotia ledifolia grows in kwongan and woodland on coastal limestone, sandplains and granite rocks in the Avon Wheatbelt, Esperance Plains, Geraldton Sandplains, Hampton, Jarrah Forest, Mallee, Swan Coastal Plain and Yalgoo bioregions of south-western Western Australia, and is listed as  "not threatened" by the Western Australian Government Department of Biodiversity, Conservation and Attractions.

This species can be used as a feature plant or as a low screen, barrier or informal hedge in native landscapes. It attracts insects and birds. 

In a 2015 study, researchers suggest that the plant is the favourite food of the quokka, an endemic marsupial in southwestern Australia.

References

Byttnerioideae
Malvales of Australia
Rosids of Western Australia
Plants described in 1821